Haplogroup F is a human mitochondrial DNA (mtDNA) haplogroup. The clade is most common in East Asia and Southeast Asia. It has not been found among Native Americans.

It is a primary branch of haplogroup R9.

Distribution
The F haplogroup is fairly common in East Asia. High frequencies of the clade are found among the Lahu from Yunnan (33% - 77%, average 52%), Nicobar Islands (50%), Shors from Kemerovo Oblast of Siberia (41%), and Arunachal Pradesh, India (31%). There is also an important frequency in Taiwanese aborigines, Khakas, Kets, Han Chinese (and, thus, nearly all of China), Lombok, Sumba, Thailand, and Vietnam. Its distribution extends with low frequency to the Tharu of southern Nepal and the Bashkirs of the southern Urals.

Haplogroup F also occurs at low frequencies on the Comoros Islands (<10%).
It is also found at low frequencies on The Hvar island in Croatia (8.3%).

Table of Frequencies of MtDNA Haplogroup F

Subclades

F1a clearly predominates among the representatives of haplogroup F in Southeast Asia, but subclades of this haplogroup have been found in populations as far north as the Buryats and Ulchi of Siberia.

F1b tends to become more frequent as a fraction of total F in populations of the northern parts of East Asia and Central Asia, such as Mongols, Kazakhs, Uyghurs, and Japanese. It also has been found among the Yi people. There are odd exclaves of F1b in Gaininsk Bashkirs of Perm Oblast and Croats of Hvar Island.

F1d is the second most frequent sub-clade in Newar (Nepal). Haplogroup F1d reaches the greatest proportion in Newar (11.97%) of Nepal and Kshatriya (16%) of North India. 
 
F2 has been found mainly in the form of F2a, which has been observed in more than 10% of a couple samples of Nu and Lisu from Gongshan, Yunnan. F2 has been found with frequencies exceeding 5% in several other populations of Southwest China, Guangxi, and Hainan, including the Han majority population. Outside of southwestern China, F2 has been found with frequency greater than 5% in a sample of Oirat Mongols from Xinjiang and a sample of Khakas from Khakassia, with the former population boasting particularly high diversity within this clade.

F3 is especially common among Austronesian peoples of Taiwan and the Malay Archipelago, but it also has been found in many populations of Southwest China and South-Central China, and in a sample of Hans from Xinjiang.

F4 has been found mainly in aboriginal populations of Taiwan and Hainan, with some representatives among samples of Filipinos from Luzon, Indonesians from Sumatra, and Hans and Uzbeks from Xinjiang.

Tree
This phylogenetic tree of haplogroup F subclades is based on the paper by Mannis van Oven and Manfred Kayser Updated comprehensive phylogenetic tree of global human mitochondrial DNA variation and subsequent published research.

F
F* – China, Korea
F1
F1a'c'f – Thailand (Kaleun in Nakhon Phanom Province), China, Korea, Kazakhstan
F1a – China, Korea, Uyghur, Thailand
F1a1'4 – Thailand (Khon Mueang in Chiang Rai Province), China
F1a1 – Japan, Korea, China, Ulchi, Uyghur, Vietnam (incl. Cờ Lao), Laos, Thailand, Indonesia, Mexico
F1a1a – Thailand, Laos, Vietnam, China (Zhanjiang, etc.), Tibet, Indonesia
F1a1a1 – Vietnam, Laos, Thailand, Cambodia, Nicobar Islands, Malay, Indonesia, China, Uyghur
F1a1b – Japan, Korea
F1a1c – Zhuang (Bama), Thailand, Tibet, Buryats (Inner Mongolia and Irkutsk Oblast), Japan
F1a1c1 – Moken
F1a1c2 – Japan, Xibo, China (Shanghai)
F1a1d – Thailand, China, Taiwan (Tsou, Bunun, Rukai), Philippines
F1a1d1 – Tao (Orchid Island)
F1a4
F1a4a – Thailand, Han Chinese (Denver), Ulchi
F1a4a1 – Taiwan (Tsou, Makatao, Bunun, Ami, etc.), Philippines (Ivatan, Ibaloi, Abaknon, Bugkalot, Kalangoya, Dulag, etc.), Guam, Malaysia (Kelantan Malay), Sumatra, Vietnam (Dao), Thailand (Khon Mueang in Mae Hong Son Province and Chiang Mai Province), South Africa
F1a4b – China
F1a2 – Thailand, Vietnam (Hmong), China (Guizhou)
F1a2a – Thailand (Phutai in Sakon Nakhon Province, Nyaw in Nakhon Phanom Province, Mon in Lopburi Province), China (Han in Zhanjiang, Dong, etc.)
F1a3 – Thailand, Uyghur
F1a3a – Filipino (Lipa City), Indonesia
F1a3a1 – Japan
F1a3a1a – Japan, Korea
F1a3a2 – Philippines (Ivatan)
F1a3a3 – Taiwan (Tsou, Bunun, Makatao, Thao), Philippines (Ivatan)
F1c – Japan
F1c1 – Japan
F1c1a – Korea, Xinjiang, Tibet, Jammu and Kashmir, Thailand (Palaung in Chiang Mai Province, Khmu in Nan Province, Khon Mueang in Lampang Province)
F1c1a1 – Russia, China (Qingdao, etc.), Evenk (New Barag Left Banner), Oroqen, Zhuang (Bama), Taiwan (Minnan)
F1c1a1a – Tibet (Shannan, Sherpa, etc.), Yi
F1c1a1b – China
F1c1a2 – Tibet, Thailand, China (Chongqing), India
F1f – Thailand, China, Lahu, Myanmar, Tibet, Cambodia, Vietnam (Hmong)
F1b - Korea
F1b1 – China, Tibet (Shigatse, etc.), Ladakh, Uyghur (Artux, etc.), Kyrgyz, Azeri, Kurd (Iran), Armenian, Turkey, Russia, Croatia
F1b1a – Japan, Korea, Uyghur
F1b1a1 – Japan, Korea
F1b1a1a – Japan, Korea, USA (African American)
F1b1a1a1 – Japan, Korea
F1b1a1a1a – Japan
F1b1a1a2 – Japan, Korea
F1b1a1a3 – Japan
F1b1a2 – Japan, Korea
F1b1b – Yakut, Uyghur, Kyrgyz, Turk, Even (Sakkyryyr, Tompo), Korea
F1b1c – China, Yi, Buryat
F1b1d – Japan, Korea
F1b1e – Uyghur, Kyrgyz, Buryat, Oroqen, Russian (Sverdlovsk Oblast)
F1b1e1 – Yakut
F1b1f – China, Uyghur, Buryat (Buryat Republic), Yakut (Namsky District), Evenk (Stony Tunguska River basin), Hungary (ancient Avars)
F1d – China, Taiwan (Minnan, etc.), Tibet (Lhasa, etc.), Thailand (Mon in Kanchanaburi Province), Japan, Kyrgyz (Artux), Hezhen, ancient Scythian
F1d1 – Tibet, Nepal (Tharu), Newar of Nepal (12%), Myanmar, Thailand (Mon in Kanchanaburi Province), China, Japan, South Africa
F1e – Thailand
F1e1 – China (Han from Hunan)
F1e1a – Japan
F1e2 – China, Kyrgyz (Tashkurgan)
F1e3 – China (Shantou, etc.), Laos (Lao in Vientiane), Thailand (Phuan in Lopburi Province and Phichit Province), Sumatra
F1g – Tibet, Thailand (Phuan in Lopburi Province, Sukhothai Province, and Phichit Province), China, Kyrgyz (Tashkurgan)
F1g1 – China (Yunnan, etc.), Vietnam (Hmong, Dao), Nepal (Newar, 2.4%)
F2
F2* – Laos (Lao in Vientiane), China, Hong Kong, Uyghur (Artux)
F2a'b'g
F2a – China (Han from Beijing, Xinjiang, etc.), Taiwan (Makatao), Korea, Japan, Kazakhstan
F2a1 – China (Han from Shandong), Naxi, Bai, Nu, Tu (Monguor), Yi, Tibetan 
F2a2 – China (Han from Zhanjiang, etc.), Miao (Guizhou), Kinh (Guangxi), Dai and Lisu (Yunnan)
F2a3 – China (Han from Xinjiang, Yunnan, Qinghai, and Shandong), Tu, Hui, Mongols in Inner Mongolia
F2b – China (Han from Qingdao), Taiwan (Hakka)
F2b1 – Thailand (Lao Isan in Roi Et Province and Chaiyaphum Province, Khon Mueang in Lampang Province), China (Han from Beijing, Xinjiang, etc.), Buryat (Irkutsk Oblast), Yakut, Even (NE Sakha Republic), Yukaghir (NE Sakha Republic), Nepal (Newar, 1.1%)
F2g – China, Ladakh
F2c – China
F2c1 – China (Shantou, etc.), Japan
F2c2 – China (Han from Beijing), Kyrgyzstan (Kyrgyz)
F2d – China, Uyghur, Thailand (Khon Mueang in Chiang Mai Province and Lamphun Province), Singapore, Japan, Kazakhstan
F2e – China, Thailand (Tai Yuan in Uttaradit Province, Phuan in Phrae Province and Lopburi Province, Khon Mueang in Chiang Mai Province), Vietnam (Dao)
F2e1 – China, Barghut (Hulun Buir)
F2f – Japan, Korea, China, Pakistan (Hazara), Azerbaijan (Astara), Bashkortostan (Bashkir), Poland
F2h'i – China
F2h – China, Tibet (Lhasa), Taiwan, Thailand (Tai Dam in Kanchanaburi Province)
F2i – China, Taiwan (Makatao), Korea
F3 (formerly R9a)
F3a – China (Han from Ili, etc.), Uyghur, Thailand
F3a1 – China (Han from Yunnan, Guizhou, Shantou, Lanzhou, etc.), Kyrgyz (Tashkurgan), Taiwan (Hakka, etc.), Thailand (Phuan in Suphan Buri Province, Shan in Mae Hong Son Province, Khon Mueang in Chiang Rai Province, Mae Hong Son Province, Chiang Mai Province, Lamphun Province, and Lampang Province), Vietnam (Hmong, Dao)
F3b – Thailand, Japan, Korea, China (Han from Qijiang), Yi
F3b1 – Philippines, Comoros (Comorian from Grande Comore), USA
F3b1a – Taiwan (Rukai, Puyuma, Paiwan, Tsou, Makatao, Bunun, Ami, etc.), Philippines (Maranao)
F3b1a1 – Philippines (Bugkalot), Indonesia
F3b1a2 – Taiwan (Puyuma, Bunun, Paiwan, etc.)
F3b1b – Madagascar, Sumatra, Philippines (Batak from Palawan Island)
F3b1b1 – Philippines (Ibaloi, Kankanaey, Ifugao), Spain, Denmark
F4
F4a – Thailand/Laos, China, Taiwan, Korea
F4a1
F4a1a – Japan, China (Han from Lanzhou, She), Taiwan
F4a1b – China, Japan
F4a2 – China, Laos (Lao in Vientiane and Luang Prabang), Thailand (Phuan in Lopburi Province, Nyah Kur in Chaiyaphum Province, Khon Mueang in Lamphun Province)
F4b – China (Han from Beijing), Thailand (Khon Mueang in Mae Hong Son Province, Lao Isan in Roi Et Province)
F4b1 – China, Taiwan (Atayal, Bunun, Saisiyat, Thao, Tsou, Ami, Makatao, etc.), Philippines, Madagascar

See also 
Genealogical DNA test
Genetic genealogy
Human mitochondrial genetics
Population genetics

References

External links 

General
Ian Logan's Mitochondrial DNA Site
Mannis van Oven's Phylotree
Haplogroup F
Spread of Haplogroup F, from National Geographic

F